Bethenny Ever After is an American reality television series on Bravo that debuted on June 10, 2010, as Bethenny Getting Married. It's a spin-off to The Real Housewives of New York. The series features Bethenny Frankel, a former castmate of The Real Housewives of New York; Jason Hoppy, Frankel's partner; Julie Plake, Frankel's assistant; and in the second season Jackie Lagratta is introduced as Frankel's co-worker. The first season documented Frankel and Hoppy as they prepared for their wedding and as well as the wedding day itself. In 2011, the series had been renamed to its current title upon renewal. Later seasons follow Frankel dealing with motherhood, the trials and tribulations of marriage and managing her businesses.

During the course of the series, 36 original episodes of Bethenny Ever After aired over three seasons.

Series overview

Episodes

Season 1 (2010)

Season 2 (2011)

Season 3 (2012)

References

External links
 
 Bethenny Frankel

Lists of American non-fiction television series episodes
Lists of American reality television series episodes
The Real Housewives spin-offs